Nemophila heterophylla is a species of flowering plant in the borage family known by the common name small baby blue eyes.

It is native to Oregon and California north of the Transverse Ranges. It grows in many types of habitat, from valley chaparral to mountain talus.

Description
Nemophila heterophylla is an annual herb with a fleshy but delicate and usually hairy stem. The lower leaves are oppositely arranged and divided into several wide lobes. Upper leaves are smaller, narrower, and alternately arranged.

Flowers are solitary, each on a short pedicel. The flower has a calyx of sepals each a few millimeters long, pointed, and covered with long hairs, and there are reflexed appendages between the sepals. The bowl-shaped flower corolla is white or blue and a few millimeters to over a centimeter wide.

The fruit is a capsule which develops within the calyx of sepals and contains a few yellowish seeds.

External links
Jepson Manual Treatment of Nemophila heterophylla
Nemophila heterophylla — UC Photo gallery

heterophylla
Flora of California
Flora of Oregon
Flora of the Cascade Range
Flora of the Klamath Mountains
Flora of the Sierra Nevada (United States)
Natural history of the California chaparral and woodlands
Natural history of the California Coast Ranges
Natural history of the Central Valley (California)
Natural history of the San Francisco Bay Area
Flora without expected TNC conservation status